Bhojpur is a neighborhood in Bhojpur Municipality which is located in Bhojpur District in Province No. 1 of Nepal. The Bhojpur Village Panchayat was established in 1962 and was renamed as Bhojpur Village development committee in 1990.

On 18 May 2014 the Government of Nepal declared 72 new municipalities within the country. At the same time, Bhojpur Municipality was declared, incorporating Bhojpur, Bhaisipankha, Bokhim and Taksar VDCs. Current wards no. 6, 7, 8 and 9 of Bhojpur Municipality belong to the core Bhojpur area which is the main urbanized settlement of Bhojpur Municipality.

At the time of 1991 Nepal census Bhojpur VDC had a population of 7,446 individuals with 2,070 households. The headquarter of the Bhojpur District and the Bhojpur Municipality is located at ward no. 7 of the Bhojpur Municipality.

References

Bhojpur Municipality